Wylie Walker Vale Jr. (July 3, 1941 – January 3, 2012) was an American endocrinologist who helped identify hormones controlling basic bodily functions.

Early life and education
Vale was born in Houston, Texas, on July 3, 1941. He completed a B.A. degree in biology at Rice University and obtained a Ph.D. in physiology and biochemistry from Baylor College of Medicine. He commenced employment at the Salk Institute for Biological Studies in San Diego, California, in 1970.

Career
In collaboration with his advisor and mentor Roger Guillemin, Vale contributed to the discovery, isolation and identification of thyrotropin releasing hormone and gonadotropin-releasing hormone in the 1970s; work that led to the Nobel Prize for Guillemin.

At the Salk Institute, Vale led efforts in identifying the group of hormones involved in human growth, reproduction and temperature. His group discovered, isolated and identified  corticotropin-releasing hormone (CRF/CRH) in 1981 and growth hormone releasing factor (GHRF) in 1982.

Vale also founded two biotechnology companies, Neurocrine Biosciences and Acceleron Pharma.

Vale was head of both the Clayton Foundation Laboratories for Peptide Biology and the Helen McLoraine Chair in Molecular Neurobiology at the Salk Institute. He died in 2012.

References

American biologists
Members of the United States National Academy of Sciences
Rice University alumni
1941 births
2012 deaths
Members of the National Academy of Medicine